The Evangelical Christian Publishers Association (ECPA) is an international non-profit trade association whose member companies are involved in the publishing and distribution of Christian content worldwide. ECPA has operated since 1974, and operates by "building networking, information, and advocacy opportunities within the industry and throughout multiple channels so that members can more effectively produce and deliver transformational Christian content".  

In addition to many programs and services ECPA provides to its members, ECPA produces the Christian BestSeller Lists each month and a weekly news publication, Rush to Press, that recaps the industry's top news.
Since 1978, ECPA has presented the annual Christian Book Awards (formerly Gold Medallion Book Awards) in several categories, including Christian Book of the Year. ECPA also presents the annual Christy Awards for Christian Fiction, the Top Shelf Awards recognizing book design excellence, and the industry's Milestone Sales Awards.

Notes

External links
 ECPA.org

Evangelical Christian publishing companies
Evangelical parachurch organizations
Christian organizations established in 1974